No Looking Back is an album by Irish-English-American singer/songwriter Gerard McMahon, released on the Full Moon/Warner Bros. label in 1983. The album was produced by Gerard McMahon and Michael Ostin. On the inside cover the album is dedicated to Christiane (his wife).

The title track from the album peaked at #85 on the Billboard Hot 100 in April 1983.

Track listing
All songs written and arranged by Gerard McMahon unless otherwise noted.
"Count on Me"
"I Wouldn't Take It from You" 
"No Looking Back" 
"She's the Woman" 
"Talking 'Bout Girls" 
"(You're) Wearing My Heart Out" (Gerard McMahon, Gary Mallaber)
"No Sweat (It's Alright)" 
"When She Was Mine" 
"Nickel Charm Jack" 
"So Many Nights"

Personnel
Gerard McMahon — producer, vocals, guitar, piano, percussion 	
Michael Ostin — producer, vocals (background), percussion 
Jimmy Hunter — drums
Bobby Gianetti — guitar (bass), vocals (background)
Albert Campbell — synthesizer, piano, organ, percussion 	 	
Kenny Lewis  — guitar (bass), guitar
Richie Zito — guitar
Dawayne Bailey — guitar, vocals (background)
Gary Mallaber — drums, synthesizer
Michael Landau — guitar
Stanley Sheldon — guitar (bass)
Jon Lind — vocals (background)
Neil Merryweather — vocals (background)
John Massaro — vocals (background)
Lita — vocals (background)
Christiane — vocals (background)
Jerry Marotta — drums
David Boruff — saxophone

References

External links
www.artistdirect.com
[ www.allmusic.com]
album review
 

1983 albums
Gerard McMahon albums